Christopher Ralph Chippindale, FSA (born 13 October 1951) is a British archaeologist. He worked at the Museum of Archaeology and Anthropology from 1988 to his retirement in 2013, and was additionally Reader in Archaeology at the University of Cambridge from 2001 to 2013.

Early life and education
Chippindale was born on 13 October 1951, to Keith and Ruth Chippindale. He was educated at Sedbergh School, a public school in Sedbergh, Yorkshire. He went on to study at St John's College, Cambridge, graduating Bachelor of Arts (BA Hons). He then studied for a Doctor of Philosophy (PhD) at Girton College, Cambridge. His doctoral thesis was title "The Later Prehistoric rock-engravings of Val Fontanalba, Mont Bego, Tende, Alpes-Maritimes, France" and was completed in 1988.

Career
Chippindale was a research fellow in archaeology at Girton College, Cambridge from 1985 to 1988 and bye-fellow from 1988 to 1991.  In 1987, he was appointed assistant curator of the Museum of Archaeology and Anthropology, University of Cambridge. He was promoted to Senior Assistant Curator in 1993. In 2001, he was appointed reader in archaeology at the University of Cambridge. He concurrently held the positions of reader and curator for British archaeology at the museum. He retired in 2013, and is now reader emeritus at the university and a senior fellow of the McDonald Institute for Archaeological Research.

Outside of his university career, he served as editor of the academic journal Antiquity for ten years, from 1987 to 1997.

Personal life
In 1976, Chippindale married Anne Lowe. Together they had four children; two sons and two daughters. They divorced in 2008. In 2008, he entered into a civil partnership with Justice Oleka. His brother Peter Chippindale was a journalist and author.

Honours
On 10 January 1991, Chippindale was elected Fellow of the Society of Antiquaries of London (FSA).

Works
His publications include: 
Stonehenge Complete (first published 1983, 4th edition 2012)
Who Owns Stonehenge? (1990)
The Archaeology of Rock Art (1998)

References

British archaeologists
Alumni of Girton College, Cambridge
Academics of the University of Cambridge
1951 births
Living people
Alumni of St John's College, Cambridge
LGBT historians
People educated at Sedbergh School
21st-century LGBT people